François Louis Drolet (born July 16, 1972) is a Canadian short track speed skater who competed in the 1998 Winter Olympics.

He was born in Sainte-Foy, Quebec City.

In 1998 he was a member of the Canadian relay team which won the gold medal in the 5000 metre relay competition. In the 1000 m event he finished eleventh and in the 500 m contest he finished 16th.

External links
 
 François Drolet at the ISU

1972 births
Living people
Canadian male short track speed skaters
Medalists at the 1998 Winter Olympics
Olympic short track speed skaters of Canada
Olympic gold medalists for Canada
Olympic medalists in short track speed skating
People from Sainte-Foy, Quebec City
Short track speed skaters at the 1998 Winter Olympics
Speed skaters from Quebec City
Universiade medalists in short track speed skating
Universiade bronze medalists for Canada
Competitors at the 1995 Winter Universiade
20th-century Canadian people